The July Ordinances, also known as the Four Ordinances of Saint-Cloud, were a series of decrees set forth by Charles X and Jules Armand de Polignac, the chief minister, in July 1830. 

Compelled by what he felt to be a growing, manipulative radicalism in the elected government, Charles felt that as king by right of birth, his primary duty was the guarantee of order and happiness in France and its people; not in political bipartisanship and the self-interpreted rights of implacable political enemies. 

On 25 July, while a guest at Saint-Cloud, he signed the infamous "July Ordinances" which were published in the Parisian newspaper  the following day. 

The ordinances of 26 July:

  Suspended the liberty of the press
  Appointed new, reactionary Councillors of State
  Dissolved the newly elected Chamber of Deputies of France
  Reduced the number of deputies in future Chambers
  Summoned new electoral colleges for September of that year
  Withdrew the Deputies' right of amendment
  Excluded the commercial middle-class from future elections

It was intended to quell the people of France. However, the ordinances had the opposite effect of angering the French citizens. Journalists gathered in protest at the headquarters of the National daily, founded in January 1830 by Adolphe Thiers, Armand Carrel, and others. The final result was the July Revolution and Charles X's abdication and exile.

References

19th-century revolutions
1830 in law
1830 in France
July 1830 events